Natalia Vladimirovna Yurchenko (born 26 January 1965) is a retired Soviet artistic gymnast, who won the women's all-around gold medal at the 1983 World Championships. Renowned for her innovative and daring gymnastics, she is best known as the originator of the Yurchenko vault family, which is a round-off  back handspring entry onto the vault, and then performing a series of twists and flips off.

Personal life 
Yurchenko was born on 26 January 1965 in Norilsk, Russian SFSR. In 1999, she immigrated to the United States. She lives in Chicago with her husband, Igor Sklyarov.

Career
Yurchenko was coached by Vladislav Rastorotsky at the Dinamo sports society in Rostov on Don. Her first international competition was the 1978 Junior Friendship Tournament, where she placed 5th all-around and won gold medals in the team competition and on bars. In the same year she debuted in the senior Riga International meet, earning the bronze on the floor.

Four years later, she won the all-around title at the USSR Championships, USSR Cup, at the prestigious Moscow News tournament and the World Cup. In 1983, she won almost all gold medals (except for the floor exercise) at the University Games and the USSR Championships. She also became the all-around World Champion, achieving two perfect 10s in the process. She qualified to all the event finals, but withdrew from the uneven bars, balance beam and floor exercise finals after an injury during the vault final, leaving with two world championship titles.

At the Friendship Games in Olomouc, Yurchenko returned from injury, battled with Olga Mostepanova and managed to win the gold medal on vault and team competition. In 1985, she once again won almost all events at the University Games (except vault and balance beam), and contributed to the team's gold medal at the World Championships.

Yurchenko was awarded the title of Honoured Master of Sports of the USSR. She retired from gymnastics in 1986, but made an appearance at the 1991 World Professional Championships in Fairfax, Virginia.

Eponymous skills
The Yurchenko vault is named after her in the Code of Points. The Yurchenko family is now a group of vaults based on the entry she used in her original Yurchenko vault (a round-off onto the table, followed by a back tuck). The Yurchenko loop is another skill she originated, but it no longer appears in the Code of Points.

Post-competitive career
Yurchenko coached at LVSA, a gymnastics club in Pennsylvania, for almost nine years, at Parkettes National Gymnastics Training Center in Allentown, Pennsylvania and at the Lakeshore Academy of Artistic Gymnastics in Chicago Illinois. In June 2015, she opened her own gymnastics academy, C.I.T.Y. Club Gymnastics Academy, in Chicago's South Loop.

Achievements

References

External links and sources
 Natalia Yurchenko Official Site
 Yurchenko Gymnastics Official Site
 C.I.T.Y. Club Gymnastics Academy Official Site
 
 Natalia Yurchenko at Gymn Forum
 Whatever happened to Natalia Yurchenko?
 Video of Natalia Yurchenko performing Yurchenko vault - 1985 Summer Universiade in Kobe, all-around

1965 births
Living people
People from Norilsk
Russian female artistic gymnasts
Soviet female artistic gymnasts
Originators of elements in artistic gymnastics
World champion gymnasts
Medalists at the World Artistic Gymnastics Championships
Sportspeople from Krasnoyarsk Krai